The 2003 Scottish Claymores season was the ninth season for the franchise in the NFL Europe League (NFLEL). The team was led by head coach Gene Dahlquist in his third year, and played its home games at Hampden Park in Glasgow, Scotland. They finished the regular season in third place with a record of six wins and four losses.

Offseason

Free agent draft

Personnel

Staff

Roster

Standings

References

Scottish
Scottish Claymores seasons